Venture Transport was the largest independent bus operator in North East England. It operated services in the Derwent Valley between Consett and Newcastle upon Tyne.

It was founded after World War I. On 1 May 1970, it was sold to the Northern General Transport Company with 86 buses.

Resurrection of the Venture name
Shortly after deregulation, Go-Ahead Northern brought back the Venture name for services from the former Venture depot in High Spen. More recently Go North East has reintroduced the name to promote services in the Consett area.

References

External links
Gallery

Former bus operators in England
1970 disestablishments in England